Khorotherium is a genus of extinct mammaliaforms. The type and only species, Khorotherium yakutensis, is known from the Lower Cretaceous Batylykh Formation in  Western Yakutia, Russia. It belongs to the family Tegotheriidae from the order Docodonta, alongside Sibirotherium from the same region, it is amongst the youngest known docodonts.

Phylogeny

References

Docodonts
Prehistoric therapsid genera
Fossil taxa described in 2018